Søren Skriver (born 10 June 1973 in Denmark) is a Danish retired footballer.

References

Danish men's footballers
Living people
1973 births
Association football midfielders
Association football forwards
Association football defenders
FC Midtjylland players